Calynn Irwin (born February 24, 1989) is a Canadian snowboarder, competing in the discipline of half-pipe.

Career

2018 Winter Olympics
In January 2018, Irwin was named to Canada's 2018 Olympic team.

References

1989 births
Living people
Snowboarders at the 2018 Winter Olympics
Olympic snowboarders of Canada
Canadian female snowboarders
Sportspeople from Toronto